Shou County or Shouxian is a county in the north-central part of Anhui Province, China, and is located on the southern (right) bank of the Huai River. It is the southernmost county-level division of the prefecture-level city of Huainan. It is a National Cultural and Historical City. The jurisdiction of Shou County was transfer from Lu'an to Huainan.

Shou County has jurisdiction over 17 towns, 7 townships and 1 ethnic township. The seat of Shou County is Shouchun.

History
Shou, formerly known as Shouchun and Shouyang, was the last capital of the State of Chu from 241 BCE, after the Chu royal court fled in advance of the sack of the previous capital Chen, by the growing power of the kingdom of Qin, on its way to imperial ascendency. King You of Chu was buried in Shou County, though his tomb was destroyed by warlords in the 1930s. From the time of the Qin Dynasty to the Three Kingdoms Period, the county fell under the jurisdiction of Jiujiang Commandery.  It was also the site of the crowning of Yuan Shu during the Three Kingdoms. During the Jìn Dynasty, the Battle of Fei River also occurred within the borders of Shou. Shou became renowned throughout China for its pottery during the Sui and Tang Dynasties. Shou was besieged during the Five Dynasties and Ten Kingdoms period. The county also produced many well-known officials during the Song Dynasty, including multiple Prime Ministers and ministers. During the Taiping Rebellion in the later years of the Qing Dynasty, Chen Yucheng was captured in Shou.

Administrative divisions
In the present, Shou County has 21 towns, 3 townships and 1 ethic township.
21 towns

3 townships
 Zhangli
 Bagongshan
 Yaokou

1 Ethic township
 Hui Taodian

Climate

Economy
Shou County is crisscrossed with rivers, and as a result it is a very productive agricultural region. Main products of this area include rice, wheat and cotton. Currently Shou County is a focal point of a national project to increase production of agricultural goods. Zhengyang Pass, located on the Wai River, is a major point of transportation and goods distribution in Anhui.

See also
 Yinxian, a town in Shou County

References

 
County-level divisions of Anhui
Huainan